César Zeoula (born 29 August 1989), formerly known as César Lolohéa, is a New Caledonian international footballer who plays as a midfielder for UA Cognac and the New Caledonia national team.

He has also played for Magenta, Lito and Mont-Dore in the New Caledonia Division Honneur.

International goals
As of match played 15 July 2019. New Caledonia score listed first, score column indicates score after each Zeoula goal.

References

External links

1989 births
Living people
New Caledonian footballers
New Caledonia international footballers
Association football midfielders
AS Magenta players
Stade Lavallois players
Ligue 2 players
AS Mont-Dore players
2016 OFC Nations Cup players